Oeiras International School (OIS) is an IB World School  in Oeiras, a suburb of Lisbon, Portugal.

Overview
Established in 2010, the English-speaking school offers the International Baccalaureate program throughout all year groups. The school caters for students in Year 6 through to Year 13, having previously hosted only students in Years 7 through 12 during its inaugural academic year (2010/11).

The school campus is based on the premises of a 17th-century palace, the Quinta de Nossa Senhora da Conceição in Barcarena, Oeiras. The 5 hectare campus was newly refurbished in 2011. During its inaugural year (2010/2011), the school opened at temporary premises, located at Fundição de Oeiras, but has since been located at its present campus.

OIS has ambitious plans to become an tensor Eco-School and intends to promote Environmental Awareness and Social Responsibility with the provision of scholarships and community service.

Motto
The school motto is Sapere Aude (Dare to Learn).

Location
Quinta de Nossa Senhora da Conceição,
à Rua Antero de Quental,
Barcarena,
2780-001 Oeiras,
Portugal

See also

Education in Portugal
Eco-Schools
Afrixalus osorioi

References

International schools in Portugal
Education in Oeiras, Portugal
Buildings and structures in Lisbon District
International Baccalaureate schools in Portugal
Educational institutions established in 2010
Education in Lisbon
2010 establishments in Portugal